Valkosel Ridge (‘Hrebet Valkosel’ \'hre-bet v&l-ko-'sel\) is the narrow rocky ridge extending 8.8 km in north–south direction and 1.6 km wide, rising to 1046 m in Aristotle Mountains on Oscar II Coast in Graham Land.  It is situated in the south foothills of Mount Sara Teodora, surmounting Belogradchik Glacier to the west, Ambergris Glacier to the east, and Flask Glacier to the south.  The feature is named after the settlement of Valkosel in Southwestern Bulgaria.

Location
British mapping in 1976.

Maps
 British Antarctic Territory.  Scale 1:200000 topographic map.  DOS 610 Series, Sheet W 65 62.  Directorate of Overseas Surveys, Tolworth, UK, 1976.
 Antarctic Digital Database (ADD). Scale 1:250000 topographic map of Antarctica. Scientific Committee on Antarctic Research (SCAR). Since 1993, regularly upgraded and updated.

Notes

References
 Valkosel Ridge. SCAR Composite Antarctic Gazetteer.
 Bulgarian Antarctic Gazetteer. Antarctic Place-names Commission. (details in Bulgarian, basic data in English)

External links
 Valkosel Ridge. Copernix satellite image

Ridges of Graham Land
Oscar II Coast
Bulgaria and the Antarctic